A snowtrout is any of a number of ray-finned fishes from the Himalayas region. These cyprinids resemble the very distantly related trouts in habitus due to convergent evolution.

Genera containing "snowtrouts" are:

 Diptychus
 Ptychobarbus
 Schizopyge
 Schizopygopsis
 Schizothorax

The species most often called "the snowtrout" is Schizothorax richardsonii, but locally the term may refer to any other snowtrout species.